The 2018 FIA World Rally Championship-3 was the sixth and final season of the World Rally Championship-3, an auto racing championship recognised by the Fédération Internationale de l'Automobile, running in support of the World Rally Championship. It was created when the Group R class of rally car was introduced in 2013.

Nil Solans and Miquel Ibáñez were the reigning drivers' and co-drivers' champions, while ADAC Sachsen were the defending teams' champions. Enrico Brazzoli and Luca Beltrame won the drivers' and co-drivers' championships. ACI Team Italia won the teams' title.

Calendar

Entries

Results and standings

Season summary

Scoring system

Points were awarded to the top ten classified finishers in each event. Six best results counted towards championship.

FIA World Rally Championship-3 for Drivers

FIA World Rally Championship-3 for Co-Drivers

FIA World Rally Championship-3 for Teams

Notes

References

External links
Official website of the World Rally Championship
Official website of the Fédération Internationale de l'Automobile

 
World Rally Championship-3